The women's 800 metres event at the 1982 Commonwealth Games was held on 5 and 7 October at the QE II Stadium in Brisbane, Australia.

Medalists

Results

Heats
Qualification: First 4 in each heat (Q) and the next 1 fastest (q) qualify for the final.

Final

References

Heats & Semifinals results (The Sydney Morning Herald)
Final results (The Sydney Morning Herald)
Heat & Semifinals results (The Canberra Times)
Australian results 

Athletics at the 1982 Commonwealth Games
1982